Music for Pleasure is the second studio album by English punk rock band the Damned. It was released on 18 November 1977 by Stiff Records.

Background 
Music for Pleasure was produced by Nick Mason of Pink Floyd. The Damned originally sought out former Pink Floyd member Syd Barrett, but were unsuccessful due to his reclusive lifestyle. In a brief interview for the documentary The Damned: Don't You Wish That We Were Dead (2015), Mason reported the band were accustomed to a much faster recording schedule than he was familiar with from Pink Floyd. The Damned hoped to record several songs on their first day in studio, when Nick Mason would still be fine-tuning the microphone set-up and tuning the drums.

The album featured new member Lu Edmonds on guitar alongside original guitarist Brian James, as well as guest saxophonist Lol Coxhill.

The album was the last album-length studio release to feature James, who would rejoin the band in the late 1980s and early 1990s for a live album and studio single. It was also the group's final album release on Stiff. On this album, the band moved into more complex song structures, while maintaining the punk sound of their debut album.

The sleeve was designed by Barney Bubbles (including the cover painting).

Release 
Released on 18 November 1977, Music for Pleasure failed to make the UK Top 100 album chart.

Critical reception 

At the time of its release, Music for Pleasure was dismissed by critics as a poor misstep. In a contemporary review, Sounds writer Peter Silverton compared the album to the second albums by the Jam and the Stranglers, where the formula was to "repeat the first album with a few minor modifications, more considered production but almost inevitably with less freshness of impact." He also noted that "mostly they have really extended on the four-piece Wall of Sound style of their first album. And it's not just that they've added a sax player on one track and a second guitarist in the form of the monosyllabic Lu". Silverton responded to negative reception of the album, noting that "they've already been written off by many who should know better but like Mr. Vanian shouts on 'Don't Cry Wolf': 'Don't cry wolf, don't be a fool'".

Trouser Press opined: "With added guitarist Lu Edmonds and no audible stylistic plan, the attack sounds blunted, and there aren't as many great songs as on the first LP. [...] Music for Pleasure doesn't live up to the title." AllMusic's retrospective review was more enthusiastic, deeming the album "a respectable punk artifact", though also "more a historical document than a great LP".

Track listing 

Notes
 Track 12: B-side of "New Rose". Produced by Nick Lowe at Pathway Studios, London. Released October 1976. 
 Track 13: B-side of "Stretcher Case Baby". Produced by Shel Talmy at Roundhouse Recording Studios, London. Released July 1977.
 Track 14: B-side of "Neat Neat Neat". Produced by Nick Lowe at Pathway Studios, London. Released February 1977.

Personnel 
 The Damned

 Dave Vanian – vocals
 Brian James – lead guitar, slide guitar on "One Way Love", backing vocals
 Lu Edmonds – rhythm guitar
 Captain Sensible – bass, backing vocals,
 Rat Scabies – drums

 Additional personnel

 Lol Coxhill – saxophone on "You Know"

 Technical

 Nick Mason – production
 Nick Griffiths – engineering
 Brian Humphries – engineering
 Barney Bubbles – cover design
 Chris Gabrin – photography

References

External links 

 

1977 albums
The Damned (band) albums
Stiff Records albums
Albums produced by Nick Mason